Meeboldia is a genus of flowering plants belonging to the family Apiaceae.

Its native range is Nepal, East Himalaya, West Himalaya, Tibet, to south-central China.
 
The genus name of Meeboldia is in honour of Alfred Meebold (1863–1952), a German botanist, writer, and anthroposophist. 
It was first described and published in Repert. Spec. Nov. Regni Veg. Vol.19 on page 313 in 1924.

Species
According to Kew:
Meeboldia achilleifolia 
Meeboldia yunnanensis

References

Apioideae
Plants described in 1924
Flora of Tibet
Flora of Nepal
Flora of West Himalaya
Flora of East Himalaya
Flora of South-Central China